Shin Dong-wook (born Shin Hwa-shik on September 14, 1982) is a South Korean actor. He is best known for his leading roles in Soulmate and Cloud Stairs (both in 2006), and his supporting role in War of Money (2007).

Career
In November 2016, Shin published his first novel, Writing, Space Journal about a man in a space elevator construction project that drifts into the galaxy, a love story between a cranky genius businessperson and a genius theoretical physicist. Soon after that, he appeared on TV for the first time in 6 years in a short video.

After a seven year hiatus in May 2017, Shin made his acting comeback with a supporting role in the drama The Guardians, in which he took a role of a Catholic priest. Later that year he was cast in the police procedural drama  Live as a policeman.

In 2018, Shin took a main role in the romance drama Dae Jang Geum Is Watching alongside Kwon Yu-ri.

Personal life
Shin stayed out of the public eye for 6 years, since 2011, when he was discharged early from mandatory military service upon diagnosis of a rare condition, complex regional pain syndrome (CRPS), a chronic disease that causes extreme bouts of pain without a known cause or cure.
On May 24, 2017 Shin appeared as a guest in the Radio Star Episode 528 and assured his illness is under control.

In July 2018, Shin's agency confirmed that he is in a relationship with a Korean traditional medicine doctor who is nine years his junior who has been a long term fan of his.

Filmography

Television series

Film
Yellow Hair 2 (2001)

Variety show
Kko Kko Tours Single♥Single (KBS2, 2008) 
Tracking! X-Boyfriend (Mnet, 2007-2008)
King of Mask Singer (MBC, 2017)

Awards and nominations

References

External links

 Shin Dong-wook Fan Cafe at Daum 
 
 

1982 births
Living people
21st-century South Korean male actors
South Korean male film actors
South Korean male television actors
Male actors from Seoul